Carlos Alberto Arroyo del Río (27 November 1893 – 31 October 1969) was President of Ecuador from 1940 to 1944. He was a member of the Ecuadorian Radical Liberal Party. During his term, the country lost the 1941 Ecuadorian–Peruvian War.

Arroyo was President of the Chamber of Deputies from 1922 to 1923, and President of the Senate in 1935 and from February 1939 to August 1940.

See also

 Ecuadorian–Peruvian War

1893 births
1969 deaths
People from Guayaquil
Ecuadorian people of Spanish descent
Ecuadorian Radical Liberal Party politicians
Presidents of Ecuador
Presidents of the Chamber of Deputies of Ecuador
Presidents of the Senate of Ecuador
World War II political leaders